Rosa-Luxemburg-Straße (L3004) is a major grade-separated highway in Frankfurt am Main, Germany. At the southern end it connects to Miquelallee and the Bundesautobahn 66 motorway close to the Europaturm and the Deutsche Bundesbank.

The route continues past the new  settlement, then parallel with U-Bahn Line A to Frankfurt's border with  where the road transitions to become Frankfurter Landstraße.

During 2020‒2021 a  bridge next to Nordwestzentrum was due to be renovated at a cost of 1.9 million.

Name 

The road's name refers to activist Rosa Luxemburg. She is portrayed at a pier of the elevated road section in Ginnheim - in pink since in German language Rosa is also a word for that colour.

References

External links

Streets in Frankfurt